Malvicino is a comune (municipality) in the Province of Alessandria in the Italian region Piedmont, located about  southeast of Turin and about  southwest of Alessandria.

Malvicino borders the following municipalities: Cartosio, Montechiaro d'Acqui, Pareto, Ponzone, and Spigno Monferrato.

References

Municipalities of the Province of Alessandria
Cities and towns in Piedmont